Commander Loftus William Jones VC (13 November 1879 – 31 May 1916) was an English recipient of the Victoria Cross, the highest and most prestigious award for gallantry in the face of the enemy that can be awarded to British and Commonwealth forces.

Naval career
Born 13 November 1879 in Southsea to Admiral Loftus Francis Jones and Gertrude (née Gray), of Petersfield, Hampshire, Jones was educated at Eastman's Royal Naval Academy. He was appointed as a sub-lieutenant to HMS Spiteful in 1901. He rose to become a commander in the Royal Navy aboard  during the First World War.

Jones was 36 years old, on 31 May 1916, at the Battle of Jutland when he performed an act of bravery for which he was awarded the Victoria Cross. Jones went down with his ship.

Citation

Commander Jones' body was washed ashore in Western Sweden some days after the battle. He was originally buried at Fiskebäckskil, Västra Götaland, Sweden. His body was transferred to the British War Graves plot in Kviberg Cemetery, Gothenburg in 1961.

The Medal
His medal was purchased by Lord Ashcroft in 2012 and is on display at the Imperial War Museum's Victoria Cross and George Cross gallery in London.

Home town memorial
There is a memorial to him outside St Peter's Church, Petersfield.

See also 

Monuments to Courage (David Harvey, 1999)
The Register of the Victoria Cross (This England, 1997)
VCs of the First World War - The Naval VCs (Stephen Snelling, 2002)

References

External links

 Royal Naval Museum
 See Your History – Loftus William Jones
 

1879 births
1916 deaths
Military personnel from Portsmouth
People from Southsea
Royal Navy officers
British World War I recipients of the Victoria Cross
British military personnel killed in World War I
Royal Navy recipients of the Victoria Cross
Royal Navy officers of World War I
People educated at Eastman's Royal Naval Academy